A Thousand Heroes is a 1992 American disaster drama television film directed by Lamont Johnson and written by Harve Bennett. The film stars Charlton Heston, Richard Thomas, and James Coburn. It is based on a true story of United Airlines Flight 232, which crash-landed at Sioux City, Iowa on July 19, 1989.

Cast
 Charlton Heston as Al Haynes
 Richard Thomas as Gary Brown
 James Coburn as Jim Hathaway
 Leon Russom as Bob Hamilton
 John M. Jackson as Dennis Nielsen
 Tom O'Brien as Chris Porter
 Philip Baker Hall as Sam Gochenour
 Tom Everett as Mack Zubinski
 Carmen Argenziano as Bill Records
 Bruce McGill as Dudley Dvorak
 Arthur Rosenberg as Dennis Fitch
 Bill Geisslinger as Chuck Sundberg
 Steven M. Porter as Gary Anderson
 Stephanie Dunnam as Elaine Brown
 Mariangela Pino as Marcia Poole

Awards and nominations

References

External links
 
 

1992 films
1992 drama films
1992 television films
1990s action drama films
1990s disaster films
1990s English-language films
American films based on actual events
American action drama films
American aviation films
American disaster films
American Broadcasting Company original programming
Disaster television films
American drama television films
Films about aviation accidents or incidents
Films directed by Lamont Johnson
Films scored by Charles Fox
Films set in 1989
Films set in Iowa
Films shot in Iowa
Films with screenplays by Harve Bennett
Television films based on actual events
1990s American films